Bukola Oriola (born 1976) is a Nigerian-American journalist. She lives in Anoka County, Minnesota, and has a son named Samuel Jacobs. She spent six years as a journalist covering education in Nigeria while still living in that country. In 2005, she came to the United States from Nigeria on a two-month work permit in order to cover a New York City meeting of the United Nations General Assembly. She married a US citizen who prevented her from establishing interpersonal relationships with anyone other than himself. He subjugated her to a life of unfree labour, confiscating all of her earnings. She was imprisoned in her home in this manner for two years. Bukola is a speaker, author, mentor, advocate, and entrepreneur.

Publicity
She wrote and self-published a book Imprisoned: The Travails of a Trafficked Victim about her experiences with human trafficking. In August 2013, she appeared on a discussion panel following a screening of the documentary film Not My Life at the Humphrey School of Public Affairs' Cowles Auditorium. On December 16, 2015, she was appointed by President Barack Obama as a member of the United States Advisory Council on Human Trafficking, and was re-appointed to the same position by President Donald Trump in April, 2018.  Bukola won  the Cadbury National Award for Education Reporters in 2005. She started a non-profit organization known as "The Enitan Story" in August 2013 to advocate for victims and empower survivors of human trafficking.

She is a fellow of the International Institute for Journalism, Germany.

References

Living people
Nigerian emigrants to the United States
Nigerian newspaper journalists
Journalists from Minnesota
American activist journalists
Imprisoned journalists
American women television journalists
American television journalists
American memoirists
American non-fiction crime writers
American education writers
American feminist writers
American women writers
People from Anoka County, Minnesota
Nigerian women writers
Black feminism
American abolitionists
Nigerian people imprisoned abroad
Nigerian women's rights activists
Nigerian victims of crime
American victims of crime
House slaves
Human trafficking in the United States
Anti–human trafficking activists
Crime victim advocates
American women's rights activists
American people of Yoruba descent
Yoruba women journalists
Yoruba women activists
American women memoirists
1976 births
Nigerian women activists
Women crime writers
Nigerian memoirists
Women civil rights activists
21st-century American women